National Police Academy can refer to:
General Santander National Police Academy, Colombia
National Police Academy, Nepal, Kathmandu
National Police Academy of Pakistan, Islamabad
Sardar Vallabhbhai Patel National Police Academy, Hyderabad, India
Swedish National Police Academy
Turkish National Police Academy